Prank My Mom is an American comedy television series on Lifetime. The series debuted on September 27, 2012 and was hosted by Vivica A. Fox.

Premise 
The television series is a Lifetime half-an-hour comedy show that provides centers around mothers being pranked by their children, by being unknowingly put in funny situations.

Cast 
 Vivica A. Fox
 Eliot Schwartz
 Alexandra Kirr
 Shelagh Ratner

Production 
The series was produced by Thinkfactory Media and Peter M. Cohen Productions. The series was executive produced by Adam Reed, Cohen, Adam Freeman, Leslie Greif Rob Sharenow, Gena McCarthy and Kimberly Chessler.

Episodes

Season 1 (2012)

References

External links 
 
 

English-language television shows
CollegeHumor
2012 American television series endings
American comedy